Carrollcliffe, now the Castle Hotel & Spa, and also having been known as Axe Castle, is a building in Tarrytown, New York which was constructed to resemble a European castle, with crenellated towers.

It was built of stone in two stages, in 1897 and 1910, and has towers and turrets.  It was originally named Carrollcliffe and was built as the residence of "General" Howard Carroll, a journalist, playwright and businessman, with intention that it should be reflect Norman castles in Wales, Scotland and Ireland.
 a newspaperman and playwright, It is based on a design by the architect Henry Franklin Kilburn.

Beginning in 1941, it served for decades as the headquarters of the financial firm Axe-Houghton Management.

It was converted to a hotel during 1994–96.

New owners Hanspeter and Steffi Walder of Tarrytown bought the property along with a group of investors in 1992. Their vision was to re-create Carrollcliff's glory days. The couple's vision was to convert the Castle into a luxury inn while rediscovering, and ultimately preserving the Castle's original beauty and charm. Their goal, Hanspeter says, is the operation of a hotel and restaurant that can be a haven for the stressed executive or professional desiring to relax in a setting that is warm, inviting, and majestic.

In 2003, Elite Hotels, a limited liability company formed by C. Dean Metropoulos, bought the property, then called The Castle at Tarrytown for $10.9 million, according to a newspaper article at the time, which described it as "a 31-room inn on 10.1 acres".
It is now a hotel and spa.

References

External links 
 Official site of The Castle Hotel and Spa
 

Hotels in New York (state)
Tarrytown, New York
Castles in New York (state)
Houses in Westchester County, New York
Hudson River Valley National Heritage Area